Ioanna Chamalidou (born 11 October 1996 in Giannitsa, Greece) is a Greek footballer who plays as a midfielder for OFI Crete F.C. and the Greece women's national football team.

Club career

From 2010 to 2018, Chamalidou played for the Greek Women's A Division team PAOK FC. While at PAOK FC, Chamalidou was on the team that won seven Greek A Division championship titles and five Greek Women's Cup championship titles. She participated in the 2011 Women's UEFA Champions League, all three Group 6 matches in the 2013–14 UEFA Women's Champions League qualifying group, all five matches in Group 2 of the 2015–16 UEFA Women's Champions League qualifying round (scoring one goal against FC NSA Sofia) and one match in the competition's knockout phase. Chamalidou could not play during her last two seasons at PAOK FC due to two successive injuries. 

By November 2018, Chamalidou had left PAOK FC, who had intended to loan her to a club outside of Thessaloniki. As she was attending the Aristotle University of Thessaloniki, Chamalidou rejected the offer and transferred to the A Division team Aris Thessaloniki F.C.

In July 2019, Chamalidou moved to Spain to sign with Zaragoza CFF, which plays in the North Group of the Segunda División Pro League.

By the end of January 2020, Chamalidou had transferred to the Istanbul-based Beşiktaş J.K. to play in the second half of the 2019–20 Turkish Women's First Football League. On 22 October 2020, she returned to Greece.

International career
As a member of the Greek women's national under-19 football team, Chamalidou took part in the 2014 UEFA Women's Under-19 Championship qualification round, playing three matches and scoring a penalty against Kazakhstan. She played in three matches at the 2015 UEFA Women's Under-19 Championship qualification round.

Chamalidou was then called up to the Greek women's national team and appeared in one of the UEFA Women's Euro 2017 qualifying Group 3 matches. After an injury that kept her off the national team list, Chamalidou returned to the team in 2020. She was a member of the team at the UEFA Women's Euro qualification round and the FIFA Women's World Cup qualification round.

References

1996 births
Living people
Footballers from Giannitsa
Greek women's footballers
Women's association football midfielders
Aristotle University of Thessaloniki alumni
PAOK FC (women) players
Zaragoza CFF players
Beşiktaş J.K. women's football players
Greece women's international footballers
Greek expatriate women's footballers
Greek expatriate sportspeople in Spain
Expatriate women's footballers in Spain
Greek expatriate sportspeople in Turkey
Expatriate women's footballers in Turkey